The 2020 World Junior Short Track Speed Skating Championships took place between 31 January and 2 February 2020 in Bormio, Italy.

Medal summary

Medal table

Men's events

Women's events

Participating nations

References

External links
Results
Results book

World Junior Short Track Speed Skating Championships
World Junior Short Track Speed Skating Championships
International speed skating competitions hosted by Italy
World Junior Short Track Speed Skating Championships
World Junior Short Track Speed Skating Championships
World Junior Short Track Speed Skating Championships
World Junior Short Track Speed Skating Championships